Marko Totka (born 12 September 2000) is a Slovak footballer who plays for MFK Tatran Liptovský Mikuláš as a midfielder.

Club career

FK Senica
Totka made his Fortuna Liga debut for Senica against ViOn Zlaté Moravce on 18 May 2019. During this home fixture, he came on as a replacement for Sacha Petshi, as Senica was in a 2 goal lead. Totka's side held on to the lead and had managed to avoid relegation. In the final match of the season, Totka was fielded again for the entire duration of the away match against Železiarne Podbrezová, who were to be relegated. Senica had lost the game 1:0, after a goal by Daniel Pavúk.

References

External links
 FK Senica official club profile 
 Futbalnet profile 
 
 

2000 births
Living people
Sportspeople from Skalica
Slovak footballers
Slovakia under-21 international footballers
Slovak expatriate footballers
Association football midfielders
FK Senica players
TJ Sokol Lanžhot players
MFK Tatran Liptovský Mikuláš players
Slovak Super Liga players
Czech Fourth Division players
Expatriate footballers in the Czech Republic
Slovak expatriate sportspeople in the Czech Republic